Chris Burnette (born April 14, 1991) is an American football offensive guard who is currently a free agent.

Professional career

Miami Dolphins
On April 27, 2013, he signed with the Miami Dolphins as an undrafted free agent following the conclusion of the 2013 NFL Draft. On August 23, 2013, he was waived by the Dolphins.

References

External links
 Georgia Bulldogs bio
 Miami Dolphins bio

Living people
Miami Dolphins players
1991 births
People from LaGrange, Georgia
Old Dominion Monarchs football players